Nedre Frei is a village in Kristiansund Municipality in Møre og Romsdal County, Norway. The village is located along the Freifjorden on the southern part of the island of Frei. Nedre Frei is the site of Frei Church, the main church for the island.

The northern end of the Freifjord Tunnel is located just west of the village, connecting the island to the nearby island of Bergsøya and then on to the mainland via a bridge.

The Viking-era Battle of Rastarkalv, between Haakon I of Norway and the sons of Eric I of Norway, took place near the village of Nedre Frei in 955 AD.

References

Villages in Møre og Romsdal
Kristiansund